A special marine warning (SAME code SMW) is a warning issued by the U.S. National Weather Service for potentially hazardous marine weather conditions usually of short duration (up to 2 hours) producing sustained marine thunderstorm winds or associated gusts of 34 knots or greater; or hail 3/4 inch or more in diameter; or waterspouts affecting areas included in a coastal waters forecast, a nearshore marine forecast, or a Great Lakes open lakes forecast that is not adequately covered by existing marine warnings. It is also used for short duration mesoscale events such as a strong cold front, gravity wave, squall line, etc., lasting less than 2 hours and producing winds or gusts of 34 knots or greater.

References

Weather warnings and advisories